Sebastian Anders Fredrik Eriksson (born 31 January 1989) is a Swedish professional footballer who plays as a midfielder for Allsvenskan club IFK Göteborg.

Club career
On 23 January 2020, Eriksson joined Italian club Genoa. On 24 August 2020, he signed for IFK Göteborg.

International career
While at IFK Göteborg, he earned five international caps for Sweden, starting with a 1–0 friendly away win against Oman on 20 January 2010. He played two more friendlies in a tour in South Africa in January 2011, and his last two appearances in the Cyprus International Tournament in February of that year.

Career statistics

Club

International

Honours
IFK Göteborg
Svenska Cupen: 2008, 2014–15
Svenska Supercupen: 2008

References

External links
 
 

1989 births
Living people
People from Mellerud Municipality
Association football midfielders
Association football fullbacks
Swedish footballers
Swedish expatriate footballers
Sweden youth international footballers
Sweden under-21 international footballers
Sweden international footballers
Cagliari Calcio players
IFK Göteborg players
Panetolikos F.C. players
Genoa C.F.C. players
Allsvenskan players
Serie A players
Super League Greece players
Expatriate footballers in Italy
Expatriate footballers in Greece
Swedish expatriate sportspeople in Italy
Swedish expatriate sportspeople in Greece
Sportspeople from Västra Götaland County